Everglades National Park  is an American national park that protects the southern twenty percent of the original Everglades in Florida. The park is the largest tropical wilderness in the United States and the largest wilderness of any kind east of the Mississippi River. An average of one million people visit the park each year. Everglades is the third-largest national park in the contiguous United States after Death Valley and Yellowstone. UNESCO declared the Everglades & Dry Tortugas Biosphere Reserve in 1976 and listed the park as a World Heritage Site in 1979, and the Ramsar Convention included the park on its list of Wetlands of International Importance in 1987. Everglades is one of only three locations in the world to appear on all three lists.

Most national parks preserve unique geographic features; Everglades National Park was the first created to protect a fragile ecosystem. The park is the most significant breeding ground for tropical wading birds in North America and contains the largest mangrove ecosystem in the Western Hemisphere. Thirty-six threatened or protected species inhabit the park, including the Florida panther, the American crocodile, and the West Indian manatee, along with 350 species of birds, 300 species of fresh and saltwater fish, 40 species of mammals, and 50 species of reptiles. The majority of South Florida's fresh water, which is stored in the Biscayne Aquifer, is recharged in the park.

Humans have lived for thousands of years in or around the Everglades. Plans arose in 1882 to drain the wetlands and develop the land for agricultural and residential use. As the 20th century progressed, water flow from Lake Okeechobee was increasingly controlled and diverted to enable explosive growth of the Miami metropolitan area. The park was established in 1934, to protect the quickly vanishing Everglades, and dedicated in 1947, as major canal-building projects were initiated across South Florida. The ecosystems in Everglades National Park have suffered significantly from human activity, and restoration of the Everglades is a politically charged issue in South Florida.

Geography

Geology
The terrain of South Florida is relatively and consistently flat. The limestone that underlies the Everglades is integral to the diverse ecosystems within the park. Florida was once part of the African portion of the supercontinent Gondwana. After it separated, conditions allowed a shallow marine environment to deposit calcium carbonate in sand, shells, and coral to be converted into limestone. Tiny bits of shell, sand, and bryozoans compressed over multiple layers forming structures in the limestone called ooids, which created permeable conditions that hold water.

The Florida peninsula appeared above sea level between 100,000 and 150,000 years ago. As sea levels rose at the end of the Wisconsin ice age, the water table appeared closer to land. Lake Okeechobee began to flood, and convection thunderstorms were created. Vast peat deposits south of Lake Okeechobee indicate that regular flooding had occurred about 5,000 years ago. Plants began to migrate, subtropical ones from the northern part of Florida, and tropicals carried as seeds by birds from islands in the Caribbean. The limestone shelf appears to be flat, but there are slight rises—called pinnacles—and depressions caused by the erosion of limestone by the acidic properties of the water. The amount of time throughout the year that water is present in a location in the Everglades determines the type of soil, of which there only two in the Everglades: peat, created by many years of decomposing plant matter, and marl, the result of dried periphyton, or chunks of algae and microorganisms that create a grayish mud. Portions of the Everglades that remain flooded for more than nine months out of the year are usually covered by peat. Areas that are flooded for six months or less are covered by marl. Plant communities are determined by the type of soil and the amount of water present.

Climate
According to the Köppen climate classification system, Royal Palm at Everglades National Park has a tropical monsoon climate (Am). Summers are long, hot, and very wet and winters are warm and dry.

Hydrography
While they are common in the northern portion of Florida, no underground springs feed water into the Everglades system. The Everglades has an immense capacity for water storage, owing to the permeable limestone beneath the exposed land. Most of the water arrives in the form of rainfall, and a significant amount is stored in the limestone. Water evaporating from the Everglades becomes rain over metropolitan areas, providing the fresh water supply for the region. Water also flows into the park after falling as rain to the north onto the watersheds of the Kissimmee River and other sources of Lake Okeechobee, to appear in the Everglades days later.

Ecosystems

At the turn of the 20th century, common concepts of what should be protected in national parks invariably included formidable geologic features like mountains, geysers, or canyons. As Florida's population began to grow significantly and urban areas near the Everglades were developed, proponents of the park's establishment faced difficulty in persuading the federal government and the people of Florida that the subtle and constantly shifting ecosystems in the Everglades were just as worthy of protection. When the park was established in 1947, it became the first area within the U.S. to protect flora and fauna native to a region as opposed to geologic scenery. The National Park Service recognizes nine distinct interdependent ecosystems within the park that constantly shift in size owing to the amount of water present and other environmental factors.

Freshwater sloughs and marl prairies

Freshwater sloughs are perhaps the most common ecosystem associated with Everglades National Park. Shark River Slough and Taylor Slough are significant features of the park. Excellent feeding locations for birds, sloughs in the Everglades attract a great variety of waders such as herons, egrets, roseate spoonbills (Platalea ajaja), ibises and brown pelicans (Pelecanus occidentalis), as well as limpkins (Aramus guarauna) and snail kites that eat apple snails, which in turn feed on the sawgrass. The sloughs' availability of fish, amphibians, and young birds attract a variety of freshwater turtles, alligator (Alligator mississippiensis), water moccasin (Agkistrodon piscivorus conanti), and eastern diamondback rattlesnake (Crotalus adamanteus).

Freshwater marl prairies are similar to sloughs but lack the slow movement of surface water; instead, water seeps through a calcitic mud called marl. Algae and other microscopic organisms form periphyton, which attaches to limestone. When it dries it turns into a gray mud. Sawgrass and other water plants grow shorter in freshwater marl than they do in peat, the other type of soil in the Everglades which is found where water remains present longer throughout the year. Marl prairies are usually under water from three to seven months of the year, whereas sloughs may remain submerged for longer than nine months and sometimes remain under water from one year to the next. Sawgrass may dominate sloughs, creating a monoculture. Other grasses, such as muhly grass (Muhlenbergia sericea) and broad-leafed water plants can be found in marl prairies. Animals living in the freshwater sloughs also inhabit marl prairies. Marl prairies may go dry in some parts of the year; alligators play a vital role in maintaining life in remote parts of the Everglades by burrowing in the mud during the dry season, creating pools of water where fish and amphibians survive from one year to the next. Alligator holes also attract other animals who congregate to feed on smaller prey. When the region floods again during the wet season, the fish and amphibians which were sustained in the alligator holes then repopulate freshwater marl prairies.

Tropical hardwood hammocks

Hammocks are often the only dry land within the park. They rise several inches above the grass-covered river and are dominated by diverse plant life consisting of subtropical and tropical trees, such as large southern live oaks (Quercus virginiana). Trees often form canopies under which animals thrive amongst scrub bushes of wild coffee (Psychotria), white indigoberry (Randia aculeata), poisonwood (Metopium toxiferum) and saw palmetto (Serenoa repens). The park features thousands of these tree islands amid sloughs—which often form the shape of a teardrop when seen from above (see park map) because of the slowly moving water around them—but they can also be found in pineland and mangroves. Trees in the Everglades, including wild tamarind (Lysiloma latisiliquum) and gumbo-limbo (Bursera simaruba), rarely grow higher than  because of wind, fire, and climate.

The plant growth around the hammock base is nearly impenetrable; beneath the canopy hammocks is an ideal habitat for animals. Reptiles (such as various species of snake and anole) and amphibians (such as the American green tree frog, Hyla cinerea), live in the hardwood hammocks. Birds such as barred owls (Strix varia), woodpeckers, northern cardinals (Cardinalis cardinalis), and southern bald eagles (Haliaeetus leucocephalus leucocephalus) nest in hammock trees. Mammal species living in hardwood hammocks include Florida black bears (Ursus americanus floridanus), red foxes (Vulpes vulpes), minks (Neogale vison), marsh rabbits (Sylvilagus palustris), gray foxes (Urocyon cinereoargenteus), white-tailed deer (Odocoileus virginianus), and the rare, critically endangered Florida panther (Puma concolor couguar).

Pineland

Pineland ecosystems (or pine rocklands) are characterized by shallow, dry sandy loam over a limestone substrate covered almost exclusively by slash pines (Pinus elliottii var. densa). Trees in this ecosystem grow in solution holes, where the soft limestone has worn away and filled with soil, allowing plants to take hold. Pinelands require regular maintenance by fire to ensure their existence. South Florida slash pines are uniquely adapted to promote fire by dropping a large amount of dried pine needles and shedding dry bark. Pine cones require heat from fires to open, allowing seeds to disperse and take hold. The trunks and roots of slash pines are resistant to fire. Prescribed burns in these areas take place every three to seven years; without regular fires, hardwood trees begin to grow in this region, and pinelands become recategorized as mixed swamp forests. Most plants in the area bloom about 16 weeks after a fire. Nearly all pinelands have an understory of palm shrubs and a diverse ground covering of wild herbs.

Within the park,  of pineland are protected. A variety of animal species meet their needs for food, shelter, nesting, and rooking in pine rocklands. Woodpeckers, eastern meadowlarks (Sturnella magna), loggerhead shrikes (Lanius ludovicianus), grackles, and northern mockingbirds (Mimus polyglottos) are commonly found in pinelands. Black bears and Florida panthers also live in this habitat.

Cypress and mangrove

Cypress trees are conifers that are adapted to live in standing fresh water. They grow in compact structures called cypress domes and in long strands over limestone. Water levels may fluctuate dramatically around cypress domes and strands, so cypresses develop "knees" that protrude from the water at high levels to provide oxygen for the root systems. Dwarf cypress trees grow in drier areas with poorer soil. Epiphytes, such as bromeliads, Spanish moss (Tillandsia usneoides), orchids and ferns grow on the branches and trunks of cypress trees. Everglades National Park features twenty-five species of orchids. Tall cypress trees provide excellent nesting areas for birds including wild turkey (Meleagris gallopavo), ibis, herons, egrets, anhingas (Anhinga anhinga), and belted kingfisher (Megaceryle alcyon). Mammals in cypress regions include white-tailed deer, squirrels, raccoons, opossums, skunks, swamp rabbits, river otters (Lontra canadensis), and bobcats, as well as small rodents.

Mangrove trees cover the coastlines of South Florida, sometimes growing inland depending on the amount of salt water present within the Everglades ecosystems. During drier years when less fresh water flows to the coast, mangroves will appear among fresh water plants. When rain is abundant, sawgrass and other fresh water plants may be found closer to the coast. Three species of mangrove trees—red (Rhizophora mangle), black (Avicennia germinans), and white (Laguncularia racemosa)—can be found in the Everglades. With a high tolerance of salt water, winds, extreme tides, high temperatures, and muddy soils, mangrove trees are uniquely adapted to extreme conditions. They act as nurseries for many marine and bird species. They are also Florida's first defense against the destructive forces of hurricanes, absorbing flood waters and preventing coastal erosion. The mangrove system in Everglades National Park is the largest continuous system of mangroves in the world.

Within the Florida mangrove systems live 220 species of fish, and a variety of crabs, crayfish, shrimp, mollusks, and other invertebrates, which serve as the main source of food for many birds. Dozens of bird species use mangroves as nurseries and food stores, including pelicans, grebes, tricolored herons (Egretta tricolor), gulls, terns, hawks and kites, and arboreal birds like mangrove cuckoos (Coccyzus minor), yellow warblers (Dendroica petechia), and white-crowned pigeons (Patagioenas leucocephala). The mangroves also support 24 species of amphibians and reptiles, and 18 species of mammals, including the endangered green turtle (Chelonia mydas), hawksbill turtle (Eretmochelys imbricata), and West Indian manatee (Trichechus manatus).

Coastal lowlands
Coastal lowlands, or wet prairies, are salt water marshes that absorb marine water when it gets high or fresh water when rains are heavy. Floods occur during hurricane and tropical storm surges when ocean water can rise several feet over the land. Heavy wet seasons also cause floods when rain from the north flows into the Everglades. Few trees can survive in the conditions of this region, but plants—succulents like saltwort and glasswort—tolerate salt, brackish water, and desert conditions.  Animal life in this zone is dependent upon the amount of water present, but commonly found animals include Cape Sable seaside sparrow (Ammodramus maritimus mirabilis), Everglades snail kite (Rostrhamus sociabilis), wood stork (Mycteria americana), eastern indigo snake (Drymarchon couperi), and small mammals such as rats, mice, and rabbits.

Marine and estuarine

The largest body of water within the park is Florida Bay, which extends from the mangrove swamps of the mainland's southern tip to the Florida Keys. Over  of marine ecosystem lies in this range. Coral, sponges, and seagrasses serve as shelter and food for crustaceans and mollusks, which in turn are the primary food source for larger marine animals.  Sharks, stingrays, and barracudas also live in this ecosystem. Pelicans, shorebirds, terns, and black skimmers (Rynchops niger) are among the birds frequenting park shorelines. The bay also has its own resident population of bottlenose dolphin (Tursiops truncatus).

The bay's many basins are broken up by sandbanks that serve as plentiful recreational fishing grounds for snook (Centropomus undecimalis), redfish (Sciaenops ocellatus), spotted seatrout (Cynoscion nebulosus), tarpon (Megaflops atlanticus), bonefish (Albula vulpes), and permit (Trichinous falcatus), as well as snapper (Lutjanus campechanus), bluegill (Lepomis macrochirus), and bass. Wading birds such as roseate spoonbills (Platalea ajaja), reddish egrets (Egretta rufescens), and great white herons (Ardea herodias occidentalis) have unique subpopulations that are largely restricted to Florida Bay. Other bird species include bald eagles, cormorants, and ospreys. Mammals along the shoreline include raccoons, opossums, bobcats, and fox squirrels.

Human history

Native peoples

Humans likely first inhabited the South Florida region 10,000 to 20,000 years ago. Two tribes of Native Americans developed on the peninsula's southern tip: the Tequesta lived on the eastern side and the Calusa, greater in numbers, on the western side. The Everglades served as a natural boundary between them. The Tequesta lived in a single large community near the mouth of the Miami River, while the Calusa lived in 30 villages. Both groups traveled through the Everglades but rarely lived within them, remaining mostly along the coast.

The diets of both groups consisted mostly of shellfish and fish, small mammals, game, and wild plants. Having access only to soft limestone, most of the tools fashioned by Native Americans in the region were made of shell, bone, wood, and animal teeth; shark teeth were used as cutting blades, and sharpened reeds became arrows and spears. Shell mounds still exist today within the park, giving archaeologists and anthropologists evidence of the raw materials available to the indigenous people for tool construction. Spanish explorers estimated the number of Tequesta at first contact to be around 800, and Calusa at 2,000; the National Park Service reports there were probably about 20,000 natives living in or near the Everglades when the Spanish established contact in the late 16th century. The Calusa lived in social strata and were able to create canals, earthworks, and shellworks. The Calusa were also able to resist Spanish attempts at conquest.

The Spanish had contact with these societies and established missions further north, near Lake Okeechobee. In the 18th century, invading Creeks incorporated the dwindling numbers of the Tequesta into their own. Neither the Tequesta nor Calusa tribe existed by 1800. Disease, warfare, and capture for slavery were the reasons for the eradication of both groups. The only evidence of their existence within the park boundaries is a series of shell mounds that were built by the Calusa.

In the early 19th century, Creeks, escaped African slaves, and other Indians from northern Florida displaced by the Creek War, formed the area's Seminole nation. After the end of the Seminole Wars in 1842, the Seminoles faced relocation to Indian territory near Oklahoma. A few hundred Seminole hunters and scouts settled within what is today Big Cypress National Preserve, to escape the forced emigration to the west. From 1859 to about 1930, the Seminoles and Miccosukee, a similar but linguistically unique tribe, lived in relative isolation, making their living by trading. In 1928, surveying and construction began on the Tamiami Trail, along the northern border of Everglades National Park. The road bisected the Everglades, introducing a steady, if small, traffic of white settlers into the Everglades.

Some members of the Miccosukee and Seminole tribes continue to live within park boundaries. Management of the park includes approval of new policies and procedures by tribal representatives "in such a manner that they do not conflict with the park purpose".

American settlements
Following the end of the Seminole Wars, Americans began settling at isolated points along the coast in what is now the park, from the Ten Thousand Islands to Cape Sable. Communities developed on the two largest pieces of dry ground in the area, on Chokoloskee Island and at Flamingo on Cape Sable, both of which established post offices in the early 1890s. Chokoloskee Island is a shell mound, a midden built roughly 20 feet (6 m) high over thousands of years of occupation by the Calusa. The settlements in Chokoloskee and Flamingo served as trading centers for small populations of farmers, fishermen, and charcoal burners settled in the Ten Thousand Islands. Both settlements and the more isolated homesteads could only be reached by boat until well into the 20th century. Everglades City, on the mainland near Chokoloskee, enjoyed a brief period of prosperity when, beginning in 1920, it served as the headquarters for the construction of the Tamiami Trail. A dirt road from Florida City reached Flamingo in 1922, while a causeway finally connected Chokoloskee to the mainland's Everglades City in 1956. After the park was established, private property in the Flamingo area was claimed by eminent domain, and the site was incorporated into the park as a visitor center.

Land development and conservation

Several attempts were made to drain and develop the Everglades in the 1880s. The first canals built in the Everglades did little harm to the ecosystem, as they were unable to drain much of it. Napoleon Bonaparte Broward based the majority of his 1904 campaign for governor on how drainage would create "The Empire of the Everglades". Broward ordered the drainage that took place between 1905 and 1910, and it was successful enough that land developers sold tracts for $30 per acre, settling the town of Davie, and developing regions in Lee and Dade counties. The canals also cleared water that made way for agricultural fields growing sugarcane.

In the 1920s, a population boom in South Florida created the Florida land boom, which was described by author Michael Grunwald as "insanity". Land was sold before any homes or structures were built on it and in some cases before any plans for construction were in place. New landowners, eager to make good on their investments, hastily constructed homes and small towns on recently drained land. Mangrove trees on the coasts were taken down for better views and replaced with shallow-rooted palm trees. The U.S. Army Corps of Engineers began construction on larger canals to control the rising waters in the Everglades. Nevertheless, Lake Okeechobee continued to rise and fall, the region was covered with rain, and city planners continued to battle the water. The 1926 Miami Hurricane caused Lake Okeechobee levees to fail; hundreds of people south of the lake drowned. Two years later, the 1928 Okeechobee Hurricane claimed 2,500 lives when Lake Okeechobee once again surged over its levees. Politicians who declared the Everglades uninhabitable were silenced when a four-story wall, the Herbert Hoover Dike, was built around Lake Okeechobee. This wall effectively cut off the water source from the Everglades.

Following the wall's construction, South Florida endured a drought severe enough to cause serious wildfires in 1939. The influx of humans had a detrimental effect on the plants and animals of the region when melaleuca trees (Melaleuca quinquenervia) were introduced to help with drainage, along with Australian pines brought in by developers as windbreaks. The region's timber was devastated for lumber supplies.  Alligators, birds, frogs, and fish were hunted on a large scale. Entire rookeries of wading birds were shot to collect their plumes, which were used in women's hats in the early 20th century. The largest impact people had on the region was the diversion of water away from the Everglades. Canals were deepened and widened, and water levels fell dramatically, causing chaos in food webs. Salt water replaced fresh water in the canals, and by 1997 scientists noticed that salt water was seeping into the Biscayne Aquifer, South Florida's water source.

In the 1940s, Marjory Stoneman Douglas, a freelance writer and former reporter for The Miami Herald,  began to research the Everglades for an assignment about the Miami River. She studied the land and water for five years and published The Everglades: River of Grass in 1947, describing the area in great detail, including a chapter on its disappearance. She wrote: "What had been a river of grass and sweet water that had given meaning and life and uniqueness to this enormous geography through centuries in which man had no place here was made, in one chaotic gesture of greed and ignorance and folly, a river of fire." The book has sold 500,000 copies since its publication, and Douglas's continued dedication to ecology conservation earned her the nicknames "Grand Dame of the Everglades", "Grandmother of the Everglades" and "the anti-Christ" for her singular focus at the expense of some political interests. She founded and served as president for an organization called Friends of the Everglades, initially intended to protest the construction of a proposed Big Cypress jetport in 1968. Successful in that confrontation, the organization has grown to over 4,000 members, committed to the preservation of the Everglades. She wrote and spoke about the importance of the Everglades until her death at age 108 in 1998.

Park history

Floridians hoping to preserve at least part of the Everglades began to express their concern over diminishing resources in the early 20th century. Royal Palm State Park was created in 1916 and protected Paradise Key; it included several trails and a visitor center several miles from Homestead. Miami-based naturalists first proposed that the area become a national park in 1923. Five years later, the Florida state legislature established the Tropical Everglades National Park Commission to study the formation of a protected area.  The commission was led by Ernest F. Coe, a land developer turned conservationist, who was eventually nicknamed Father of Everglades National Park. Coe's original plan for the park included more than  including Key Largo and Big Cypress, and his unwillingness to compromise almost prevented the park's creation. Various other interests, including land developers and sport hunters, demanded that the size of the park be decreased.

The commission was also tasked with proposing a method to raise the money to purchase the land. The search coincided with the arrival of the Great Depression in the United States, and money for land purchase was scarce. The U.S. House of Representatives authorized the creation of the new national park on May 30, 1934, but the Act (HR 2837), which permanently reserved lands donated by public or private donation as wilderness, passed only with a rider that ensured no money would be allotted to the project for at least five years. Coe's passion and U.S. Senator Spessard Holland's politicking helped to fully establish the park, after Holland was able to negotiate  of the park, leaving out Big Cypress, Key Largo, the Turner River area, and a  tract of land called "The Hole in the Donut" that was too highly valued for agriculture. Miami Herald editor John Pennekamp was instrumental in pushing the Florida Legislature to raise $2 million to purchase the private land inside the park boundaries. It was dedicated by President Harry Truman on December 6, 1947, one month after Marjory Stoneman Douglas's book The Everglades: River of Grass was released.

The Central and Southern Florida Flood Control Project (C&SF) was authorized by Congress to construct more than one thousand miles of canals and flood control structures across South Florida. The C&SF, run by the U.S. Army Corps of Engineers, established an agricultural area directly south of Lake Okeechobee, and three water conservation areas, all bordered by canals that diverted excess water either to urban areas or into the Atlantic Ocean, Gulf of Mexico or Florida Bay. South of these manmade regions was Everglades National Park, which had been effectively cut off from its water supply. By the 1960s, the park was visibly suffering. The C&SF was directed to provide enough water to sustain the park; it did not follow through. A proposed airport that would have dire environment effects on Everglades National Park became the center of a battle that helped to initiate the environmental movement into local and national politics. The airport proposal was eventually abandoned, and in 1972 a bill was introduced to curb development in South Florida and ensure the national park would receive the amount of water it needed. Efforts turned to repairing the damage wrought by decades of mismanagement: the Army Corps of Engineers changed its focus in 1990 from constructing dams and canals to constructing "purely environmental projects".

Regions originally included in Ernest Coe's vision for a national park were slowly added over the years to the park or incorporated into other protected areas: Biscayne National Park, Big Cypress National Preserve, John Pennekamp Coral Reef State Park on Key Largo, Ten Thousand Islands National Wildlife Refuge, and Florida Keys National Marine Sanctuary were all protected after the park's opening in 1947. Everglades National Park was designated an International Biosphere Reserve on October 26, 1976. On November 10, 1978, about 86% of the park, was declared a wilderness area. It was renamed the Marjory Stoneman Douglas Wilderness in 1997. It was listed as a UNESCO World Heritage Site on October 24, 1979, and as a Wetland of International Importance on June 4, 1987. It was placed on the List of World Heritage in Danger from 1993 until 2007 and then again in 2010.  The park was added again due to the continued degradation of the set causing significant indications of eutrophication (for example algal blooms) negatively impacting the marine life causing the US government to request UNESCO and IUCN for assistance in development.

Restoration efforts

President George H. W. Bush signed the Everglades National Park Protection and Expansion Act on December 13, 1989, that added  to the eastern side of the park, closed the park to airboats, directed the Department of the Army to restore water to improve the ecosystems within Everglades National Park, and "Direct(ed) the Secretary of the Interior to manage the Park in order to maintain the natural abundance, diversity, and ecological integrity of native plants and animals, as well as the behavior of native animals, as part of their ecosystem." Bush remarked in his statement when signing the act, "Through this legislation that river of grass may now be restored to its natural flow of water".

In 2000, Congress approved the Comprehensive Everglades Restoration Plan (CERP), a federal effort to restore the Everglades with the objectives of "restoration, preservation and protection of the south Florida ecosystem while providing for other water-related needs of the region", and claiming to be the largest environmental restoration in history. It was a controversial plan; detractors worried that it "relies on uncertain technologies, overlooks water quality, subsidizes damaging growth and delays its environmental benefits". Supporters of the plan included the National Audubon Society, who were accused by Friends of the Everglades and the Biodiversity Legal Foundation of prioritizing agricultural and business interests.

CERP projects are designed to capture  of fresh water every day, store it in underground reservoirs, and release the water to areas within 16 counties in South Florida. The plan aims to spend $10.5 billion over 30 years, combining 50 different projects and giving them 5-year timelines. 

Everglades National Park was directly hit by Hurricanes Katrina, Wilma, and Rita in 2005. Such storms are a natural part of the park's ecosystem; 1960's Hurricane Donna left nothing in the mangroves but "standing dead snags" several miles wide, but 30 years later the area had completely recovered. Predictably, what suffered the most in the park from the 2005 hurricanes were man-made structures. In 2009 the visitor center and lodge at Flamingo were irreparably damaged by  winds and an  storm surge; the lodge had been functioning for 50 years when it was torn down; nothing is slated to replace it.

Park economics
Everglades National Park reported in 2005 a budget of over $28 million. Of that, $14.8 million was granted from the National Park Service and $13.5 million from various sources including CERP, donations, and other grants. The entry fee for private vehicles in 2021 is $30. Of the nearly one million visitors to Everglades National Park in 2006, more than 38,000 were overnight campers, paying $16 a night or $10 a night for backcountry permits. Visitors spent $2.6 million within the park and $48 million in local economies. More than 900 jobs were sustained or created within or by the park, and the park added value of $35 million to local economies.

Leadership and administration 
Everglades National Park has had 19 superintendents since it was dedicated in 1947. The park's first superintendent, Daniel Beard (1947-1958), was also its longest-serving. After Superintendent Beard, Warren F. Hamilton served between 1958 and 1963, followed by Stanley C. Joseph (1963-1966), Roger W. Allin (1966-1968), John C. Raftery (1968-1970), Joseph Brown (1970-1971), Jack E. Stark (1971-1976), John M. Good (1976-1980), John M. Morehead (1980-1986), Marueen E. Finnerty (Acting Superintendent, 1986), Michael V. Finley (1986-1989), Robert L. Arnberger (Acting Superintendent, 1989), Robert S. Chandler (1989-1992), Dick Ring (1992-2000), Marueen E. Finnerty (2000-2003), Dan Kimball (2004-2014), Shawn Benge (Acting Superintendent, 2014), Bob Krumenaker (Acting Superintendent, 2014-2015), and finally Pedro Ramos, who was appointed in 2015 and continues to serve.

The park was placed into Administrative Region I in 1937, when the regions were first established. Region I was retitled the Southeast Region in 1962, which was restructured into the Southeast Area in 1995. The reorganized unified Interior regions put it in the new Region 2.

Activities
The busiest season for visitors is from December to March, when temperatures are lowest and mosquitoes are least active. The park features five visitor centers: on the Tamiami Trail (part of U.S. Route 41) directly west of Miami is the Shark Valley Visitor Center. A fifteen-mile (24 km) round trip path leads from this center to a two-story observation tower. Tram tours are available during the busy season. Closest to Homestead on State Road 9336 is the Ernest F. Coe Visitor Center, where a  road begins, winding through pine rockland, cypress, freshwater marl prairie, coastal prairie, and mangrove ecosystems. Various hiking trails are accessible from the road, which runs to the Flamingo Visitor Center and marina, open and staffed during the busier time of the year. The Gulf Coast Visitor Center is closest to Everglades City on State Road 29 along the west coast. The Gulf Coast Visitor Center gives canoers access to the Wilderness Waterway, a 99-mile (160 km) canoe trail that extends to the Flamingo Visitor Center. The former Royal Palm State Park was the site of the first Everglades National Park visitor center and later became the Royal Palm Visitor Center within the park. 
The western coast of the park and the Ten Thousand Islands and the various key islands in Florida Bay are accessible only by boat.

Trails

Several walking trails in the park vary in hiking difficulty on Pine Island, where visitors can cross hardwood hammocks, pinelands, and freshwater sloughs. Starting at the Royal Palm Visitor Center, the Anhinga Trail is a half-mile self-guided tour through a sawgrass marsh where visitors can see alligators, marsh and wading birds, turtles, and bromeliads. Its proximity to Homestead and its accessibility make it one of the most visited sites in the park. The nearby Gumbo Limbo Trail is also self-guided, at half-mile long. It loops through a canopy of hardwood hammocks that include gumbo limbo (Bursera simaruba), royal palms (Roystonea), strangler figs (Ficus aurea), and a variety of epiphytes.

Twenty-eight miles (45 km) of trails start near the Long Pine Key campgrounds and wind through Long Pine Key, well-suited for offroad cycling through the pine rocklands in the Marjory Stoneman Douglas Wilderness Area. Two boardwalks allow visitors to walk through a cypress forest at Pa-Hay-O-Kee, which also features a two-story overlook, and another at Mahogany Hammock (referring to Swietenia mahagoni) that takes hikers through a dense forest in the middle of a freshwater marl prairie. Closer to Flamingo, more rugged trails take visitors through mangrove swamps, along Florida Bay. Christian Point Trail, Snake Bight Trail, Rowdy Bend Trail and Coastal Prairie Trail allow viewing of shorebirds and wading birds among the mangroves. Portions of the trails may be impassable depending on the time of year, because of mosquitoes and water levels. Ranger-led tours take place in the busier season only.

Camping and recreation
Camping is available year-round in Everglades National Park. Camping with some services is available at Long Pine Key, close to the Ernest F. Coe Visitor Center, where 108 sites are accessible by car. Near Flamingo, 234 campsites with some services are also available. Recreational vehicle camping is available at these sites, but not with all necessary services. Back-country permits are required for campsites along the Wilderness Waterway, Gulf Coast sites, and sites in the various keys. Several back-country sites are chickees; others are beach and ground sites.

Low-powered motorboats are allowed in the park; the majority of salt water areas are no-wake zones to protect manatees and other marine animals from harm. Jet skis, airboats, and other motorized personal watercraft are prohibited. Many trails allow kayaks and canoes. A state license is required for fishing. Fresh water licenses are not sold in the park, but a salt water license may be available. Swimming is not recommended within the park boundaries; water moccasins, snapping turtles (Chelydra serpentina), alligators, and crocodiles thrive in fresh water. Sharks, barracuda, and sharp dangerous coral are plentiful in salt water. Visibility is low in both salt water and fresh water areas.

Everglades National Park is an important part of the Great Florida Birding Trail. It has great biodiversity and many species of birds for bird watching and bird photography also.

Dark skies site

Portions of Everglades National Park are ideal for dark sky observations in South Florida. The best viewing locations are in the remote southern and western areas of the Everglades, such as Flamingo and the Ten Thousand Islands. The Milky Way appears brightest when looking south, toward the least light-polluted areas.

Threats to the park and ecology

Diversion and quality of water

Less than 50 percent of the Everglades which existed prior to drainage attempts remains intact today. Populations of wading birds dwindled 90 percent from their original numbers between the 1940s and 2000s. The diversion of water to South Florida's still-growing metropolitan areas is the Everglades National Park's number one threat. In the 1950s and 1960s,  of canals and levees, 150 gates and spillways, and 16 pumping stations were constructed to direct water toward cities and away from the Everglades. Low levels of water leave fish vulnerable to reptiles and birds, and as sawgrass dries it can burn or die off, which in turn kills apple snails and other animals that wading birds feed upon. Populations of birds fluctuate; in 2009, the South Florida Water Management District claimed wading birds across South Florida increased by 335 percent. Following three years of increasing numbers, The Miami Herald reported in 2009 that populations of wading birds within the park decreased by 29 percent.

Cities along the west coast of Florida rely on desalinization for fresh water; the quantity demanded is too great for the land to provide. Nitrates in the underground water system and high levels of mercury also impact the quality of fresh water the park receives. In 1998, a Florida panther was found dead in Shark Water Slough, with levels of mercury high enough to kill a human. Increased occurrences of algal blooms and red tide in Biscayne Bay and Florida Bay have been traced to the amounts of controlled water released from Lake Okeechobee. The brochure given to visitors at Everglades National Park includes a statement that reads, "Freshwater flowing into the park is engineered. With the help of pumps, floodgates, and retention ponds along the park's boundary, the Everglades is presently on life support, alive but diminished."

Urban encroachment
A series of levees on the park's eastern border marks the line between urban and protected areas, but development into these areas threatens the park system. Florida still attracts nearly a thousand new residents every day, and building residential, commercial and industrial zones near Everglades National Park stresses the water balance and ecosystems within the park. On the park's western border, Fort Myers, Naples, and Cape Coral are expanding, but no system of levees exists to mark that border. National Geographic rated both Everglades National Park and Big Cypress National Preserve the lowest-scoring parks in North America, at 32 out of 100. Their scoring system rated 55 parks by their sustainable tourism, destination quality, and park management. The experts who compiled the results justified the score by stating: "Encroachment by housing and retail development has thrown the precious ecosystem into a tailspin, and if humankind doesn't back off, there will be nothing left of one of this country's most amazing treasures".

Endangered and threatened animals

Thirty-six federally protected animals live in the park, some of which face grave threats to their survival.

In the United States, the American crocodile's only habitat is within South Florida. They were once overhunted for their hides. They are protected today from hunting but are still threatened by habitat destruction and injury from vehicle collisions when crossing roads to reach waterways. About 2,000 crocodiles live in Florida, and there are roughly 100 nests in the Everglades and Biscayne National Parks. Crocodiles populations in South Florida have increased as has the number of alligators. Crocodiles were reclassified from "endangered" to "threatened" in the United States in 2007.

The Florida panther is one of the most endangered mammals on earth. About 230 live in the wild, primarily in the Everglades and the Big Cypress Swamp. The biggest threats to the panther include habitat destruction from human development, vehicle collisions, inbreeding due to their limited gene pool, parasites, diseases, and mercury poisoning.

Four Everglade species of sea turtle including the Atlantic green sea turtle, the Atlantic hawksbill, the Atlantic loggerhead (Caretta caretta), and the Atlantic ridley (Lepidochelys kempii) are endangered. Also, the leatherback sea turtle (Dermochelys coriacea) is threatened. Numbers are difficult to determine, since males and juveniles do not return to their birthplace; females lay eggs in the same location every year. Habitat loss, illegal poaching, and destructive fishing practices are the biggest threats to these animals.

The range of the Cape Sable seaside sparrow is restricted to Everglades National Park and the Big Cypress Swamp. In 1981 6,656 Cape Sable seaside sparrows were reported in park boundaries, but surveys over 10 years documented a decline to an estimated 2,624 birds by 2002. Attempts to return natural levels of water to the park have been controversial; Cape Sable seaside sparrows nest about a foot off the ground, and rising water levels may harm future populations, as well as threaten the locally endangered snail kite. The Everglades snail kite eats apple snails almost exclusively, and the Everglades is the only location in the United States where this bird of prey exists. There is some evidence that the population may be increasing, but the loss of habitat and food sources keep the estimated number of these birds at several hundred.

The West Indian manatee has been upgraded from endangered to threatened. Collisions with boats and habitat loss are still its biggest threats.

Drought, fire, and rising sea levels
Fire naturally occurs after lightning storms but takes its heaviest toll when water levels are low. Hardwood hammock and cypress trees are susceptible to heavy damage from fire, and some may take decades to grow back. Peat built up over centuries in the marsh can cause fires to burn deep scars in the soil. In 2007, Fred Sklar of the South Florida Water Management District said: "An extreme drought can be viewed (as) almost as catastrophic as a volcano. It can reshape the entire landscape. It can take 1,000 years to produce two inches of peat, and you can lose those couple of inches in a week."

Rising sea levels caused by global warming are another threat to the future of the park. It is estimated that within 500 years freshwater habitats in the Everglades National Park will be obliterated by salt water, leaving only the northernmost portion of the Everglades. Cost estimates for raising or replacing the Tamiami Trail and Alligator Alley with bridges are in the hundreds of millions of dollars.

Through Trump Administration, The Florida Department of Transportation, and Everglades National Park, there are plans to execute and complete the Next Steps project to help fix these various water issues, along with other parts of the park. This completion plan was announced in September 2020, will begin November 2020, and should be done by the end of 2024.

Non-native species

The introduction of non-native species into South Florida is a considerable problem for the park. Many of the biological controls such as weather, disease, and consumers who naturally limit plants in their native environments do not exist in the Everglades, causing many to grow larger and multiply far beyond their average numbers in their native habitats. Approximately 26 percent of all fish, reptiles, birds, and mammal species in South Florida are exotic—more than in any other part of the U.S.—and the region hosts one of the highest numbers of exotic plant species in the world.

Species that adapt the most aggressively to conditions in the Everglades, by spreading quickly or competing with native species that sometimes are threatened or endangered, are called "invasive". Thousands of exotic plant species have been observed in South Florida, usually introduced as ornamental landscaping, but park staff must eradicate such invasive plants as melaleuca tree (Melaleuca quinquenervia), Brazilian pepper (Schinus terebinthifolius), and Old World climbing fern (Lygodium microphyllum). Similarly, animals often do not find the predators or natural barriers to reproduction in the Everglades as they do where they originate, thus they often reproduce more quickly and efficiently. Lobate lac scale insects (Paratachardina pseudolobata) kill shrubs and other plants in hardwood hammocks. Bromeliad beetles (Metamasius callizona) destroy bromeliads and the ecosystems they host.

Walking catfish (Clarias batrachus) can deplete aquaculture stocks and they carry enteric septicemia. The Florida Fish and Wildlife Conservation Commission (FWC) listed eight "Reptiles of Concern", including the Burmese python (Python molurus bivittatus), focusing on them for their large sizes and aggressive natures, allowing licensed hunters to kill any listed animals in protected areas and sell their meat and hides. Burmese pythons, two subspecies of African rock pythons (Python sebae; northern and southern), and yellow anacondas (Eunectes notaeus) were banned from import into the U.S. in 2012. United States Secretary of the Interior Ken Salazar announced the inclusion of these reptiles at Everglades National Park. Exotic species control falls under the management of the U.S. Fish and Wildlife Service, which has been compiling and disseminating information about invasive species since 1994. Control of invasive species costs $500 million per year, but  of land in South Florida remains infested.

See also
List of birds of Everglades National Park
List of national parks of the United States
Dry Tortugas National Park
Environmental Impact of the Big Cypress Swamp Jetport
Nike Missile Site HM-69
World Heritage Sites in Danger

References

Bibliography

Davis, Jack (2009), An Everglades Providence: Marjory Stoneman Douglas and the American Environmental Century, University of Georgia Press (2009). 
Douglas, Marjory (1947). The Everglades: River of Grass. Florida Classics Library.  
Ferriter, Amy; Serbesoff-King, Kristina; Bodle, Mike; Goodyear, Carole; Doren, Bob; Langeland, Ken (2004). Chapter 8E: Exotic Species in the Everglades Protection Area, South Florida Water Management District
Grunwald, Michael (2006). The Swamp: The Everglades, Florida, and the Politics of Paradise. Simon & Schuster. 
Hammer, Roger (2005). Everglades National Park and the Surrounding Area: A Guide to Exploring the Great Outdoors, Morris Book Publishing, LLC. 
Lodge, Thomas (2005). The Everglades Handbook: Understanding the Ecosystem. CRC Press. 
McCally, David (1999). The Everglades: An Environmental History. University Press of Florida. 
Robertson, Jr. William (1989). Everglades: The Park Story. Florida National Parks & Monuments Association, Inc. 
Rodgers, LeRoy; Bodle, Mike; Laroche, Francois (2010). Chapter 9: Status of Nonindigenous Species in the South Florida Environment, 2010 South Florida Environmental Report (Volume I), South Florida Water Management District.
South Florida Water Management District (2010). Chapter 6: Ecology of the Everglades Protection Area. 2010 South Florida Environmental Report: Volume I—The South Florida Environment. Retrieved on May 26, 2010.
Tebeau, Charlton W. (1955). The Story of the Chokoloskee Bay County and the Reminiscences of Pioneer C. S. "Ted" Smallwood, University of Miami Press.
Tebeau, Charlton W. (1963) They Lived in the Park: The Story of Man in the Everglades National Park, University of Miami Press.
Tebeau, Charlton W. (1968) Man in the Everglades, University of Miami Press. 
Whitney, Ellie et al., eds. (2004). Priceless Florida: Natural Ecosystems and Native Species, Pineapple Press, Inc.

External links

 Everglades National Park UNESCO Collection on Google Arts and Culture
The Everglades in the Time of Marjory Stoneman Douglas - photo exhibit created by the State Archives of Florida
Reclaiming the Everglades: South Florida's Natural History
Everglades National Park Protection and Expansion Act
UNESCO World Heritage Centre
Marjory Stoneman Douglas Wilderness
Short public television episode on the Florida Everglades
U.S. National Parks Net: Everglades National Park

 

National parks in Florida
Archaeological sites in Florida
Biosphere reserves of the United States
Parks in Collier County, Florida
Parks in Miami-Dade County, Florida
Parks in Monroe County, Florida
1947 establishments in Florida
Protected areas established in 1947
Ramsar sites in the United States
Wilderness areas of Florida
World Heritage Sites in the United States
Shell middens in Florida
Wetlands of Florida
World Heritage Sites in Danger